Bárbara Pereira de Alencar (February 11, 1760 – August 18, 1832) was a Brazilian merchant and revolutionary, who was a major figure in the Pernambucan revolt. She was briefly the president of the Republic of Crato, which was set up in revolt against the Brazilian government. Within 8 days she was captured and tortured by the monarchy, making her the first political prisoner in the history of Brazil.

Biography
De Alencar was born on February 11, 1760, in Exu, Pernambuco, then a rural part of Pernambuco, and as a teenager she moved to Crato (then a village) in Ceará. There she married the Portuguese trader José Gonçalves do Santos, and the two established properties where they profited from the work of enslaved people.

De Alencar was an important figure during the Pernambucan revolt, based in Crato. She was the head of the provisional government that was established by the revolutionaries, serving as the president of the Republic of Crato for 8 days. However, she was quickly captured, and was held and tortured in the fortress Fortaleza de Nossa Senhora da Assunção. This made her the first political prisoner in the history of Brazil.

De Alencar survived the 70-day Pernambucan revolt and her capture by the authorities, but she was repeatedly forced to flee from political persecution, until she died in 1832 in Fronteiras, Piauí.

In addition to being a revolutionary herself, Bárbara de Alencar was the mother of the revolutionaries José Martiniano Pereira de Alencar and Tristão Gonçalves (pt), the grandmother of the writer José de Alencar, and an ancestor of the author Paulo Coelho.

Impact
The Centro Cultural Bárbara de Alencar (Bárbara de Alencar Cultural Center) awards the Bárbara de Alencar Medal every year to three women who act in ways that improve society
The administrative center of the Government of Ceará is called the Bárbara de Alencar Administrative Center
A statue of Bárbara de Alencar stands in Fortaleza
de Alencar's name is inscribed in the book of Brazilian national heroes in the federal cenotaph Tancredo Neves Pantheon of the Fatherland and Freedom
de Alencar was the subject of an epic poem by the writer Caetano Ximenes de Aragão (pt)

References

1760 births
1832 deaths
People from Pernambuco
Brazilian revolutionaries
19th-century Brazilian businesspeople
19th-century businesswomen
18th-century Brazilian women
18th-century Brazilian people